A Tea-picking opera is a form of musical entertainment.

It originally derived from the tea-growing region around Mount Jiulong in the South of Jiangxi Province in China, where the tea pickers would sing lengthy songs to each other whilst undertaking the monotonous task of tea-picking. The songs were often in three parts with different groups of pickers, singing different parts.  These folk songs were gradually adopted by performing troupes of singers and eventually became known as Tea picking operas.

In Taiwan, the Hakka people have a form called the "Hakka Tea-picking Opera".

Huangmei opera originates from the tea-picking song around Huangmei County, Hubei.

Further References

Chinese opera
Hakka culture in China
Hakka culture in Taiwan
Tea culture
Culture in Jiangxi